Thomas Gibb (born 13 December 1944) is a Scottish former professional footballer who played as a midfielder.

Career
Born in Bathgate, Gibbs began his career in junior football with Wallhouse Rose and Bathgate Thistle, before turning professional in 1963 with Partick Thistle. He later played for Newcastle United, Sunderland and Hartlepool United before retiring in 1978. Gibb was part of the Newcastle team that won the Inter-Cities Fairs Cup in 1969.

References

External links

In The Mad Crowd

1944 births
Living people
Scottish footballers
Bathgate Thistle F.C. players
Partick Thistle F.C. players
Newcastle United F.C. players
Sunderland A.F.C. players
Hartlepool United F.C. players
Scottish Football League players
English Football League players
Scotland under-23 international footballers
Association football midfielders
FA Cup Final players
People from Bathgate
Footballers from West Lothian